Zeng Guang (born 22 May 1946) is a Chinese epidemiologist who is a chief scientist and doctoral supervisor at the Chinese Center for Disease Control and Prevention (Chinese CDC). He is a member of the High-level Expert Panel of National Health Commission.

Biography
Zeng was born in 1946 in the Republic of China. After graduating from Hebei Medical College (now Hebei Medical University), he was in graduate school of Peking Union Medical College, studying for a master's degree in medical science. He was a visiting scholar at the Centers for Disease Control and Prevention (CDC) between 1985 and 1986. In 2003, he served as a consultant for the SARS Prevention and Control Headquarters. In a June 2021 interview with Chinese Communist Party-owned tabloid Global Times, Zeng stated that a probe into the origins of COVID-19 should shift to the United States.

References

External links 
 

1946 births
Living people
Hebei Medical University alumni
Peking Union Medical College alumni
Chinese epidemiologists
COVID-19 researchers